Pedroso, La Rioja is a small village in Spain.

References

Municipalities in La Rioja (Spain)